Thomas Earl Emmer Jr. (born March 3, 1961) is an American attorney and politician serving as the House Majority Whip since 2023 and the U.S. representative for  since 2015. The district includes the far western and northern suburbs of Minneapolis in the Twin Cities metropolitan area. It also covers a large part of rural Central Minnesota, an area abundant in agricultural activity. St. Cloud, to the northwest along the Mississippi River, is the district's largest city.

Before his election to Congress, Emmer served three terms as a member of the Minnesota House of Representatives from 2005 to 2011. He lost the 2010 Minnesota gubernatorial election to Minnesota Democratic–Farmer–Labor Party nominee Mark Dayton by less than half a percentage point.

Emmer was elected to Congress in 2014, winning the 6th district seat being vacated by Michele Bachmann. He has since been reelected four times. Emmer chaired the National Republican Congressional Committee from 2019 to 2023. After the 2022 United States House of Representatives elections, he won the race for House Majority Whip.

Early life, education
Emmer was born in South Bend, Indiana; his family later moved to Edina, Minnesota. He attended St. Thomas Academy, an all-male, Catholic, military, college-preparatory high school in Mendota Heights, near Saint Paul.

Emmer attended Boston College and the University of Alaska Fairbanks, graduating in 1984 with a Bachelor of Arts in political science. He played hockey for both schools. In 1988 Emmer received a Juris Doctor from William Mitchell College of Law in Saint Paul, Minnesota.

Career 
Emmer began his legal career representing cities and counties through the League of Minnesota Cities Insurance Trust and the League of Minnesota Counties Insurance Trust, handling lawsuits against police officers. He also represented volunteer firefighters and city and county inspectors, and handled a variety of land use issues. He was licensed to practice law in Minnesota, North Dakota, and Wisconsin.

Emmer served on city councils in Independence, Minnesota, and then in Delano, Minnesota.

Minnesota House of Representatives
In 2004 incumbent Republican State Representative Dick Borrell of Minnesota's House District 19B decided to retire. District 19B includes portions of Wright and Hennepin Counties and the cities of Otsego, Albertville, St. Michael, Rockford, Delano, Montrose, and Waverly. Emmer, the Republican candidate, defeated Democrat Lori M. Schmidt, an attorney, 60%–40%, in the November 2004 general election.

In 2006 Emmer won reelection to a second term with 61% of the vote. In 2008 he was reelected to a third term with 61% of the vote. In 2010 he chose to run for governor of Minnesota rather than seek reelection.

During legislative sessions, Emmer regularly rode the bus to the Minnesota State Capitol. Emmer served on the Finance Committee, the Health Care and Human Services Policy and Oversight Committee, and the State and Local Government Operations Reform, Technology and Elections Committee. He was also a member of the Finance Subcommittee for the Health Care and Human Services Finance Division, and of the Health Care and Human Services Policy and Oversight Subcommittee for the Licensing Division.

2010 gubernatorial election

Emmer officially announced his candidacy for governor of the State of Minnesota in July 2009. In January 2010, Emmer came in second to Marty Seifert in a non-binding straw poll of Republican Party caucus participants. In April 2010, Emmer announced that his running mate would be Metropolitan Council member Annette Meeks. Emmer received the endorsements of former Alaska Governor Sarah Palin, Governor Tim Pawlenty, and Lieutenant Governor Carol Molnau. On April 30, 2010, the Republican Party of Minnesota officially endorsed Emmer as its candidate for governor at the state convention in Minneapolis. His main opponent, Marty Seifert, withdrew from the race and endorsed Emmer when it became apparent that Emmer was nearing the threshold for party endorsement. On August 10, 2010, Emmer won the Republican primary with 82% of the vote, a 75-point margin over Bob Carney.

The race attracted national attention as the "first case in this election cycle of a company hit by national protests over a campaign donation". Minnesota-based Target Corporation donated $150,000 to Minnesota Forward, a new political action committee paying for advertising that supported Emmer's gubernatorial election. Emmer said he viewed Target's donation as an exercise in free speech and wanted to keep his campaign focused on economic issues. Best Buy also donated $100,000 to Minnesota Forward.

Emmer trailed his Democratic opponent Mark Dayton by 9,000 votes in the initial general election results, a margin small enough to trigger an automatic recount. Most analysts felt it was unlikely that the Emmer campaign could overcome such a deficit in a recount. After the recount made little difference in the results, Emmer conceded the election on December 8, 2010.

Post-2010 election activities
Emmer was a registered lobbyist in Minnesota, and co-hosted a morning talk radio program with Bob Davis on KTLK in Minneapolis.

In early 2011, he ran for an open Minnesota seat on the Republican National Committee, but lost that election to Hennepin County Commissioner Jeff Johnson.

Emmer hosted a 2011 event promoting the launch of Representative Ron Paul's presidential campaign in Minnesota.

U.S. House of Representatives

Elections

2014 

Upon the surprise retirement of U.S. Representative Michele Bachmann, Emmer was considered a possible candidate for the Sixth Congressional District seat; his state house district included a large slice of the congressional district's western portion. On June 5, 2013, Emmer officially announced he would seek the Republican nomination for the seat. On February 4, 2014, Emmer received 67.9% of the vote in a 6th district straw poll. On April 12 he received the Republican Party endorsement for the nomination on the first ballot with 76%, but he still faced a primary challenge from his two competitors, Anoka County Board Chairwoman Rhonda Sivarajah and former state representative Phil Krinkie. Emmer was endorsed by the Tea Party Express, Young Americans for Liberty's Liberty Action Fund, and many Minnesota legislators. He won the primary with 73% of the vote, and easily prevailed in the November general election.

2016 
In 2016 Emmer defeated Democratic nominee David Snyder, 66% to 34%.

2018 

In 2018 Emmer defeated Democratic nominee Ian Todd, 61% to 39%.

2020 

In 2020 Emmer defeated Democratic nominee Tawnja Zahradka 66% to 34%.

2022 

In 2022 Emmer defeated Democratic nominee Jeanne Hendricks, 62% to 37%.

Tenure

According to the McCourt School of Public Policy at Georgetown University, Emmer held a Bipartisan Index Score of -0.0 in the 116th United States Congress for 2019, which placed him 192nd out of 435 members. Based on FiveThirtyEight's congressional vote tracker at ABC News, Emmer voted with Donald Trump's stated public policy positions 91.5% of the time, which ranked him average in the 116th United States Congress when predictive scoring (district partisanship and voting record) is used.

In October 2020, after it was determined that Emmer had interacted with individuals who tested positive for coronavirus in Washington D.C., such as Donald Trump. Emmer flew on a Delta flight in violation of the airline's rules, potentially exposing the other passengers to the virus.

On May 19, 2021, Emmer and the other seven Republican House leaders voted against establishing a national commission to investigate the January 6, 2021 attack on the United States Capitol Complex. Thirty-five House Republicans and all 217 Democrats present voted to establish such a commission.

In August 2021, Emmer released a statement about the resignation of Minnesota Republican Party chair Jennifer Carnahan after her ties with donor, strategist, and alleged sex trafficker Anton Lazzaro became a national news story. Emmer had previously received a $15,600 donation from Lazzaro, which Emmer said he would donate to charity.

On November 15, 2022, after Republicans gained the House majority, Emmer was elected Majority Whip. He won what was reportedly the conference's closest race, beating Drew Ferguson on the first ballot and Jim Banks on the second by a 115-106 vote.

Committee assignments 
Committee on Financial Services
Subcommittee on Investor Protection, Entrepreneurship, and Capital Markets
Subcommittee on National Security, International Development, and Monetary Policy

Caucus memberships 
Republican Main Street Partnership
Republican Study Committee

Political positions

Abortion
Emmer opposes abortion.

BPA
In 2009, Emmer voted against legislation to prohibit sales of any children's product containing Bisphenol-A (except for used children's products). He said he voted against the law because of fear of "increased costs." As well-intentioned as people may be, he said, "they don't think about what this vote means five steps down the line".

Bullying
During an October 9, 2010, televised debate, Emmer said he would oppose legislation to combat school bullying against gay and lesbian young people. Emmer, who voted against anti-bullying legislation as a state lawmaker, said that teachers are most responsible for halting bullies, but suggested that the threat of lawsuits keeps them from doing so. "I don't think we need more laws; I think we need more understanding," he said.

Climate and environment

As a state representative, in 2007 Emmer called climate science "Al Gore's climate porn", referring to Gore's documentary An Inconvenient Truth.

Emmer co-sponsored a 2022 nonbinding resolution in support of domestic oil and gas production, which did not pass. The proposal urged the House to "support the safe and responsible development of its energy resources via drilling".

The environmental advocacy League of Conservation Voters has given Emmer a lifetime store of 5%, the lowest in Minnesota's congressional delegation. Recent votes improved his 2021 score to 21%, compared to the U.S. House average of 57%.

Copper nickel mining in northern Minnesota

Emmer supports two copper nickel mines in the Superior National Forest. They are planned by Polymet, which is owned by Switzerland-based mining giant Glencore, and Twin Metals, which is owned by Antofagasta, a Chilean mining company controlled by the Luksics, one of Chile's wealthiest families.

When the Department of Interior did not list copper or nickel as two of 35 "critical minerals" essential to national security, Emmer released a press release of a letter he wrote to Department of Interior Secretary Ryan Zinke requesting that copper and nickel be included.

Emmer and Representative Pete Stauber both stood beside Assistant Secretary of the Interior Joseph Balash as he signed leases permitting Twin Metals to explore a large area of national forest land nine miles southeast of Ely for copper-nickel reserves on May 15, 2019. The Obama administration had mothballed the lease renewal pending an environmental review, but Twin Metals is now in possession of a 10-year lease to explore the area, with a view toward opening a mine there.

Crypto
Tom Emmer is an outspoken proponent of cryptocurrency and digital assets. He introduced the bipartisan Securities Clarity Act in an effort to establish regulatory clarity for digital assets in the US. In March 2023, after the collapse of crypto-friendly Silvergate Bank and Signature Bank, he sent a bipartisan letter to FDIC Chairman Martin J. Gruenberg inquiring about the alleged weaponization of banking instability to purge legal crypto companies from the banking system.

Drunk driving
In 2009, Emmer sponsored a bill that would shorten the period of license revocation for driving under the influence and for refusing to take a sobriety test. Additionally, though "suspected drunken drivers [currently] face revocation before they go to court," Emmer's bill would have delayed revocations until after conviction. Supporters of Emmer's bill said "it's needed because pre-conviction revocations penalize drivers before proving they're guilty." Mothers Against Drunk Driving and the head of the Minnesota DWI task force opposed the legislation because it would allow arrested drivers to continue to drive during the time between their arrest and hearing.

Emmer's own history became an issue in relation to his bill. At age 20, Emmer received a driving under the influence-related ticket. In 1991 he pleaded guilty to careless driving while two charges for DWI and a license-plate violation were dropped. Emmer denied that his own drunk driving and legal consequences played a part in the bill, stating, "We all come to the Legislature with life experiences, but it has nothing to do with this bill." Emmer also said that his sentence in 1981 should have been harsher, because in that case he "probably wouldn't have taken the second chance" that led to his subsequent arrests and guilty plea in 1991.

On May 13, 2010, Emmer was one of three legislators not to vote on a bill that would have provided such tougher penalties for drunk drivers. He said he missed the vote when a previously scheduled lunch ran long, and that he had "no idea" how he would have voted on the bill, but that he "assume[d]" he would have supported it.

"Fire Pelosi" machine gun video
In an October 2022 CBS News television interview, Emmer was challenged for posting a video on Twitter that showed him firing a fully automatic machine gun with the caption "#FIREPELOSI". As chair of the National Republican Congressional Committee (NRCC), Emmer led 2022 election efforts to win a majority and replace House Speaker Nancy Pelosi. The post occurred just days before the home invasion and attack on Pelosi's husband in California.

Healthcare
Emmer favors repealing the Affordable Care Act (Obamacare). After supporting the March 2017 version of the American Health Care Act (a bill to repeal the ACA), he voted for it on May 4, 2017, before it had been scored by the Congressional Budget Office to determine its economic impact.

Minimum wage
In 2005, as a state representative, Emmer introduced an amendment that would have eliminated Minnesota's minimum wage law.

National security
Emmer supported President Donald Trump's 2017 executive order to temporarily curtail immigration from seven predominantly Muslim countries until better screening methods are devised, saying, "Everybody needs to take a deep breath. There is no litmus test based on religion. The administration and I understand it has — takes the seven countries identified by the Obama administration, not this administration, as the most dangerous countries when it comes to potential terrorists."

Pharmacy conscience clause
Emmer has supported "conscience clause" legislation that would allow pharmacists to refuse to dispense contraception on the basis of "ethical, moral or legal grounds as long as the pharmacist notifies their employer in advance and the employer can ensure a patient has timely access to the drug or device".

Same-sex marriage
Emmer supported a state constitutional amendment banning civil recognition of same-sex marriage or its legal equivalent, stating, "I believe marriage is the union between one man and one woman." In March 2007, Emmer introduced HF 1847, a proposed amendment to the Minnesota Constitution "recognizing as marriage or its legal equivalent only a union between one man and one woman." Voters later rejected this proposal.

Emmer was among 47 Republican Representatives who voted in favor of the Respect for Marriage Act, which would codify the right to same-sex marriage in federal law.

Allegations of antisemitism 
In 2019, Emmer sent a fundraising letter that critics alleged included antisemitic tropes. The letter claimed that "left-wing radicals essentially BOUGHT control of Congress for the Democrats" and that three Jewish billionaires (Michael Bloomberg, Tom Steyer and George Soros) "bought" control of Congress for Democrats.

Emmer vigorously rejected the allegations, and numerous Republicans pushed back against them, including Matt Brooks of the Republican Jewish Coalition, who argued, "Firstly, Tom Steyer isn’t even Jewish; he’s a practicing Episcopalian. Secondly, people can’t simply be shielded from criticism because they’re Jewish, not when otherwise similar people are criticized for the same exact actions. If it’s fair to criticize the Kochs, like leading Democrat presidential candidates have done, then its fair to criticize the top Democratic funders."

State sovereignty
In 2010 Emmer sponsored an amendment to the Minnesota Constitution that would allow the state to nullify federal laws.

Taxes
Emmer strongly opposes tax increases. He has also proposed gradually reducing the state corporate tax, with the eventual goal of repealing it altogether.

Texas v. Pennsylvania
In December 2020, Emmer was one of 126 Republican members of the House of Representatives to sign an amicus brief in support of Texas v. Pennsylvania, a lawsuit filed at the United States Supreme Court contesting the results of the 2020 presidential election, in which Joe Biden defeated incumbent Donald Trump. The Supreme Court declined to hear the case on the basis that Texas lacked standing under Article III of the Constitution to challenge the results of an election held by another state.

House Speaker Nancy Pelosi issued a statement that called signing the amicus brief an act of "election subversion." She also reprimanded Emmer and the other House members who supported the lawsuit: "The 126 Republican Members that signed onto this lawsuit brought dishonor to the House. Instead of upholding their oath to support and defend the Constitution, they chose to subvert the Constitution and undermine public trust in our sacred democratic institutions."

"Tip credit"
On July 5, 2010, after visiting a restaurant in St. Paul, Emmer was asked during a press conference if he supported a tip credit, the policy of allowing businesses to subtract tips from a server's hourly wage. His response was "Yes... if you didn't have a minimum wage law", adding, "somebody could be taking home well over one hundred thousand dollars as a server" while the restaurant owner could be making much less.

One week after that press conference, Emmer announced a proposal that would exempt the first $20,000 a server makes in tips from state taxes. At the same press conference a protester dumped $20 in pennies on Emmer's lap.

Personal life
In 1910 Emmer's great-grandfather and his two brothers founded Emmer Brothers Lumber. It is now called Viking Forest Products and is employee-owned.

Emmer has seven children with his wife, Jacqueline, whom he married in 1986. He is a hockey player and coach.

References

External links

 Congressman Tom Emmer official U.S. House website
 Campaign website

 
 
 

|-

|-

|-

|-

|-

1961 births
20th-century American lawyers
21st-century American politicians
Candidates in the 2010 United States elections
Living people
Republican Party members of the Minnesota House of Representatives
Minnesota city council members
Minnesota lawyers
People from Edina, Minnesota
People from Wright County, Minnesota
Politicians from South Bend, Indiana
Republican Party members of the United States House of Representatives from Minnesota
Tea Party movement activists
William Mitchell College of Law alumni